John McPhail or Macphail may refer to: 
 John McPhail (footballer) (1923–2000), Scottish footballer
 John McPhail (director)
 John McPhail (basketball)
 John Macphail (rugby union)
 John MacPhail (born 1955), Scottish footballer